Steven G. Xiarhos  (born December 8, 1958) is an American politician and retired law enforcement officer serving as a member of the Massachusetts House of Representatives from the 5th Barnstable district. Elected in November 2020, he assumed office on January 6, 2021.

Early life and education 
Xiarhos was born and raised in New Bedford, Massachusetts. He earned an Associate of Science in criminal justice and safety studies from Cape Cod Community College, a Bachelor of Science in criminal justice and law enforcement administration from Northeastern University, and a Master of Science in criminal justice and law enforcement administration from Anna Maria College.

Career 
Xiarhos worked as a police officer in Yarmouth, Massachusetts from 1979 to 2019, retiring as deputy chief. During his career, Xiarhos also worked as a school resource officer, detective, and patrol sergeant. Xiarhos has also been a member of the board of directors of the Massachusetts Iraq and Afghanistan Fallen Heroes Memorial Fund. Xiarhos was elected to the Massachusetts House of Representatives in November 2020 and assumed office on January 6, 2021. In the House, Xiarhos is the ranking member of the State Administration and Regulatory Oversight Joint Committee and Veterans and Federal Affairs Joint Committee.

Personal life 
Xiarhos and his first wife, Lisa, had four children, the oldest was son Nicholas Xiarhos. Nicholas died in Afghanistan while serving in the United States Marine Corps.

References 

People from New Bedford, Massachusetts
Northeastern University alumni
Anna Maria College alumni
People from Yarmouth, Massachusetts
Republican Party members of the Massachusetts House of Representatives
1958 births
Living people